Alessandro Frigerio Payán  (15 November 1914 – 10 January 1979) was a Swiss-Colombian footballer who played as a forward.

Club career
Frigerio began his career in the youth team of Lugano in 1930. After spending some time in the youth team of English club Liverpool, he returned to Switzerland, where he joined Servette.

Frigerio made his professional debut in the Young Fellows Juventus, where he played for eight years, during which they won the 1935–36 Swiss Cup. Frigerio was the scorer of the 1936–37 Nationalliga.

In mid-1937, Frigerio was acquired by the French club Le Havre, with whom he won the 1937–38 French Division 2. After that season returned to Switzerland, due to the outbreak of the Second World War. Between 1939 and 1942 he played for Lugano, with whom he won the 1940–41 Nationalliga and were runners up in the 1942–43 Swiss Cup, being the goalscorer of the 1940–41 and 1941–42 Nationalliga.

Frigerio played four years at the club Bellinzona, and ended his career in 1949 at the club Chiasso.

International career
Frigerio made his international debut on 6 March 1932 at the age of 17 (a record that lasted a long time) in a friendly match against Germany in Leipzig that ended in a 2–0 defeat. Frigerio played a total of 10 matches between 1932 and 1937, and scored his only goal in a 2–2 draw against Yugoslavia on 24 September 1933 in a 1934 FIFA World Cup qualifier match. He was called for the 1938 FIFA World Cup squad, however he did not play any match.

Managerial career
Frigerio played 1947–48 Nationalliga B as a player-manager of Chiasso. That year the team was the runner-up in the league, tied on 36 points with Urania Genève Sport, which was promoted for next year. The next season, Italian Alfredo Foni (also player-manager) replaced Frigerio as coach. Frigerio left football in 1949, returned as manager of Chiasso in 1951, and retired again that year.

Personal life
Son of Swiss Reinaldo Frigeiro, a consul, and Colombian María Payán, Alessandro lived in Buenaventura until age 8.

Career statistics

Club
This table is incomplete, thus some stats and totals could be incorrect.

International

International appearances

International goals

|}

Honours

Club
Bellinzona
1. Liga (1): 1943–44

Chiasso
Nationalliga B:
Runner-up (1): 1947–48

Le Havre
Division 2 (1): 1937–38

Lugano
Nationalliga (1): 1940–41
Swiss Cup:
Runner-up (1): 1942–43

Young Fellows Zürich 
Swiss Cup (1): 1935–36

Individual
Nationalliga top goalscorer (3): 1936–37, 1940–41, 1941–42

External links

References

1914 births
1979 deaths
Swiss men's footballers
Switzerland international footballers
Swiss expatriate sportspeople in England
Swiss people of Colombian descent
Colombian footballers
Colombian expatriate sportspeople in Switzerland
Colombian expatriates in England
Swiss Super League players
Servette FC players
Le Havre AC players
FC Lugano players
AC Bellinzona players
FC Chiasso players
Ligue 1 players
Ligue 2 players
1938 FIFA World Cup players
SC Young Fellows Juventus players
Swiss football managers
FC Chiasso managers
Association football forwards
People from Tumaco
Sportspeople from Nariño Department